The breeds of poultry in the British Poultry Standards of the Poultry Club of Great Britain include chickens, ducks, geese and turkeys.

Chickens

Ducks

Geese

Turkeys

References

Lists of British domestic animal breeds
Poultry standards